A Love Extreme is the first studio album by the American musician Benji Hughes. It was released on July 22, 2008, with Keefus Ciancia, David Susskind and Gus Seyffert producing. The album was recorded at The Green Room Studios in Los Feliz, California and Sargent Studios in Echo Park, California. The album was released on compact disc and on 180-gram vinyl pressing by New West Records.

Track listing
All tracks by Keith Ciancia & Benji Hughes except where noted

Personnel
Benji Hughes and Keefus Ciancia, all performed music except:
Gus Seyffert – bass on Disc 1, tracks 5, 7, and 10; Disc 2, tracks 3, 5, 6, 7, 10, 11; drums and vocals on Disc 2, track 5; drums Disc 2, track 10
Jonathan Wilson – guitar on Disc 2, track 3
Barbara Gruska – drums on Disc 2, tracks 3 and 14
Bram Inscore – keyboards on Disc 2, track 6
Jade Vincent – vocals on Disc 1, track 9
Joey Waronker – drums on Disc 1, tracks 2, 3, 5 and 10
Mike Andrews – guitar on Disc 1, tracks 5 and 10
Morgan Nagler – vocals on Disc 1, track 8 and Disc 2, track 14
Jay Bellerose – drums on Disc 2, tracks 7 and 11
Aaron Robinson – acoustic guitar on Disc 2, track 6

References

External links 
 New West Records: The Official Site

 Benji Hughes on Myspace

2008 albums
New West Records albums
Benji Hughes albums